Aino Emma Wilhelmina Malmberg  Perenius (February 24, 1865 – February 3, 1933) was a Finnish writer and politician.

Malmberg was born in Hollola to Pastor John Perenius and Edla Olivia Björkstén. She took her matriculation examination in 1884 and graduated from the University of Helsinki in 1886. Malmberg then worked as an English teacher at various schools, and from 1898 to 1908 at the Finnish Business Institute.

Malmberg had to leave Finland in 1910 to England because of her participation in the fight against the Russian government. She represented the Independent Labour Party at the eighth congress of the Second International at Copenhagen in 1910. She returned to Finland upon the country's independence in 1917.

Malmberg was married from 1887 to 1910 to lecturer Emil Othniel Malmberg. They had three sons, Lauri Malmberg, Erik Malmberg and Olavi Malmberg.

Malmberg died in Helsinki.

Works 
 Tien ohesta tempomia.  Otava 1901
 Totta ja leikkiä.  Otava 1903
 Yksinkö?  Otava 1903
 Maailmaa kierrellessä.  Rosma, Helsinki 1922
 Voimakasta väkeä.  Otava 1926
 Voimatonta väkeä.  Otava 1927
 Suomi Australiassa : matkahavaintoja.  Otava 1929
 Johtajia.  Otava 1933

External links 

 
 
 
 Finnish writers database

1865 births
1933 deaths
People from Hollola
People from Häme Province (Grand Duchy of Finland)
Independent Labour Party politicians
Finnish writers
Writers from Päijät-Häme
University of Helsinki alumni
Teachers of English as a second or foreign language
Finnish schoolteachers